The Kleine Kahl ("Little Kahl") is a left tributary of the Kahl in the northern Spessart in Lower Franconia, Bavaria, Germany. The spring is located about 2 km southeast of Kleinkahl. In this community it flows into the Kahl.

References

Rivers of Bavaria
Rivers of the Spessart
Rivers of Germany